Rare earth may refer to:
 Rare-earth elements, a group of elements on the periodic table
 Rare-earth mineral, a mineral substantively composed of these elements
 Rare-earth magnet, a type of magnet that employs rare earth elements to increase effectiveness
 Rare Earth hypothesis, the theory that complex life in the universe is exceptionally rare
 as a proper noun:
 Rare Earth: Why Complex Life Is Uncommon in the Universe, a book by Peter Ward and Donald E. Brownlee
 Rare Earth (band), an American musical group
 Rare Earth Records, a subsidiary of Motown Records which produced rock music